Guzmania regalis is a plant species in the genus Guzmania. This species is endemic to Ecuador.

References

regalis
Flora of Ecuador